Blok A Station is a rapid transit station on the North-South Line of the Jakarta MRT in Jakarta, Indonesia.

The station is close to Blok A of Kebayoran Baru, as well as Blok A market (Pasar Blok A).

History 

Station layout

Gallery

References

External links 

  Blok A Station on the Jakarta MRT website

South Jakarta
Jakarta MRT stations
Railway stations opened in 2019